Black River, New Brunswick may refer to:
 Black River, Saint John County
 Black River-Hardwicke
 Black River, Kent County
 Black River (New Brunswick), a river in Northumberland County